Kitkiata Inlet is an inlet on the North Coast of British Columbia, Canada, off the west side of Douglas Channel.

Reserves in this area, including those named on the Quaal River article, are under the governance of the Hartley Bay Indian Band of the Gitga'at.

References

Inlets of British Columbia
North Coast of British Columbia